The 2020–21 DBL Cup was the 53rd edition of the Netherlands' national basketball cup tournament. This season the format was changed due to the compressed playing schedule caused by the ongoing COVID-19 pandemic. Only teams from the Dutch Basketball League participated this year and all games are to be played in one week.

The season was one of the most surprising in Dutch basketball history, as seventh-seeded Yoast United and eight-seeded BAL reached the final. BAL won the final in the Landstede Sportcentrum to win its first-ever Cup title.

Format
The four highest-ranked teams from the 2020–21 Dutch Basketball League regular season are automatically qualified for the quarterfinals. The teams 5-12 play in the eight-finals.

Qualification and seeding

Bracket

First round

Quarterfinals

Semifinals

Final

Winning roster

See also
2020–21 Dutch Basketball League

Notes

References

2021
Cup